Jodie Speers (born 22 October 1982) is an Australian journalist, news and television presenter.

Speers currently presents Seven Early News.

Career 
After finishing school, Speers studied for a Communications degree at Sydney University.  She completed part of her degree on exchange at the Paris Institute of Political Studies (Sciences Po) in Paris.

In 2009, Speers became a political correspondent for the Seven Network in its Parliament House bureau. She covered the oustings of Kevin Rudd and Malcolm Turnbull, and spent five weeks on the road with Julia Gillard and Tony Abbott as they fought for victory in the 2010 election. After covering politics for a time Speers moved on to become a crime and court reporter for Seven News Sydney.

In January 2016, Speers was appointed presenter of Seven Early News replacing Natalie Barr.

Personal life 
Speers is married to former Today sports presenter and current 2GB breakfast host Ben Fordham. They married in 2011.

In August 2014, Fordham announced on Today that his wife Jodie was pregnant with their first child. Speers gave birth to a son in December 2014.  The couple had a second child in  2016, and a third in 2019.

References

1982 births
Australian journalists
Living people
People educated at Monte Sant'Angelo Mercy College